Eastern Orthodoxy in Korea consists of two Eastern Orthodox Churches and a religious organization, the canonical Korean Orthodox Church in South Korea and the Korean Orthodox Committee in North Korea. Korean Orthodox Committee operates the Church of the Life-Giving Trinity (Pyongyang).

In February 2019, due to a schism since 2018, with the Russian Orthodox Church severing full communion with the Ecumenical Patriarchate because the latter considered its canonical territory in Ukraine being violated, the Russian Orthodox Church established a diocese in Korea within a 'Patriarchal Exarchate' in South–East Asia (PESEA); the person appointed as the first head and archbishop of the Russian Orthodox diocese of Korea within the PESEA is the ethnically Korean-Russian archbishop Theophanes.

See also
Christianity in Korea

References

 
Religion in South Korea